York (First Exit to Brooklyn) is an album by The Foetus Symphony Orchestra featuring Lydia Lunch, released in 1997 by Thirsty Ear Recordings. Unlike Foetus' other albums, York is a wholly collaborative work. A "travelogue and exploration of DUMBO (Down Under the Manhattan Bridge Overpass)", York features J. G. Thirlwell as composer and conductor for a group of notable New York City musicians. The musicians, almost all of whom had worked with Thirlwell before, were encouraged to freely improvise on their parts. Lydia Lunch, a regular Thirlwell collaborator, narrates the proceedings.

Track listing

"Arschficken" is a version of Wiseblood's "The Fudge Punch."

Personnel 
Steven Bernstein – trumpet, slide trumpet
Oren Bloedow – guitar, electric Oud
Brian Emrich – bass guitar, EBow, keyboard bass
Lydia Lunch – spoken word
David Ouimet – trombone
Marcus Rojas – tuba, didgeridoo
Vinnie Signorelli – drums
Rob Sutton – engineering
J. G. Thirlwell – vocals, conch, tin whistle, production, illustrations
Kurt Wolf – guitar

References

External links 
 
 York at foetus.org

1997 live albums
Foetus (band) albums
Industrial albums
Thirsty Ear Recordings albums